Scopula lautaria, the small frosted wave moth, is a moth of the family Geometridae. It was described by Jacob Hübner in 1831. It is found in North America, including Florida, Georgia, Mississippi, South Carolina and Texas.

References

Moths described in 1831
lautaria
Moths of North America
Taxa named by Jacob Hübner